Tankani (Aymara tanka hat and biretta of priests, -ni a suffix to indicate ownership, "the one with a hat (or biretta)", Hispanicized spellings Tancane, Tangane) is a mountain in the Andes of southern Peru, about  high. It is situated in the Puno Region, Puno Province, San Antonio District, near the border with the Moquegua Region. Tankani lies northwest of the mountain Chuqipata.

References

Mountains of Puno Region
Mountains of Peru